Nikos Kechagias (born 24 April 2000) is a Greek professional footballer who plays as a centre-back.

References

2000 births
Living people
Greek footballers
Super League Greece 2 players
Football League (Greece) players
Gamma Ethniki players
Agrotikos Asteras F.C. players
Association football defenders
Footballers from Thessaloniki